Three Bridges is an unincorporated community located within Readington Township in Hunterdon County, New Jersey, United States, on the South Branch Raritan River. It is named for the three original bridges which crossed the river.

Farmers John Vlerebone and Harriet Foster Cline were original land owners in the area of Three Bridges. They eventually sold some land to the Central Railroad of New Jersey for its South Branch Line which passed on to the Black River and Western Railroad. Vlerebone and Kline subdivided their land along Old York Road after 1864.

In 1875 the Lehigh Valley Railroad built the New Jersey extension of its main line through Three Bridges using its Easton and Amboy Railroad subsidiary where it still runs today now owned by Norfolk Southern Railway. Numerous lines for shipping produce and a number of daily passenger lines stopped in the village in its heyday. Many of the businesses left along with the passenger lines.  Today the village houses a post office, bank,a branch of the Hunterdon County Library System and several other businesses.

Demographics

References

Unincorporated communities in Readington Township, New Jersey
Unincorporated communities in Hunterdon County, New Jersey
Unincorporated communities in New Jersey